Randy Hilliard (born February 6, 1967) is a former American football defensive back who played for three teams with the National Football League (NFL). Hilliard was drafted by the Cleveland Browns in the 1990 NFL Draft out of Northwestern State University In 1998, Hilliard was a part of the Denver Broncos' Super Bowl XXXII winning team.

1967 births
Living people
American football cornerbacks
American football safeties
Chicago Bears players
Cleveland Browns players
Denver Broncos players
East Jefferson High School alumni
Northwestern State Demons football players
Players of American football from New Orleans